The pearl onion (Allium ampeloprasum var. sectivum or A. ampeloprasum 'Pearl-Onion Group'), also known as button, baby or silverskin onions in the UK, is a close relative of the leek (A. ampeloprasum var. porrum), and may be distinguished from common onions by having only a single storage leaf, similar to cloves of garlic. In French they are known as oignon grelot.  One English-speaking reference also mentions the term petit poireau antillais.

Cultivation and storage
Pearl onions are cultivated mostly in Germany, the Netherlands, and Italy, usually in home gardens, although formerly on a commercial scale. They are mostly used for pickling.

The majority of onions grown for pickling are common onions (A. cepa). They are grown to a small size suitable for pickling by planting at a high density.

Known small white varieties include Crystal Wax, or White Bermuda. Red varieties are milder in flavour.
Pearl onions are ready to harvest from seed in 90 days. They can be stored for up to a month in a cool, dry, dark place.

Consumption

Because of its uniquely small size and a taste sweeter than that of a common onion, it has also been used in dishes ranging from mid-20th-century American casserole dishes such as succotash to sweetly flavored onion relishes in Indian cuisine. It can also be used in stews soups or sautéed (fried) with other vegetables. It can also be used in cocktails such as "martini standing".

Pearl onions are a staple to the cuisine of Northern Europe. Also in modern Europe they are used as a beautiful flowering plant and in Israel as a cut flower.

Pearl onions contain chemical compounds that have health benefits including helping cardiovascular health and stabilize blood sugar levels, and acting as an antioxidant and anti-inflammatory.

Cultural references
Larry Wall's yearly serious State of the Onion speeches about advancements in Perl programming, an allusion to the many layers of the language, are named as a pun both on the pearl onion and the US presidents' State of the Union addresses.

References 

Onions
Food plant cultivars